Petar Mandajiev (6 November 1929 – 2008) was a Bulgarian equestrian and Olympic medalist. He won a silver medal in dressage at the 1980 Summer Olympics in Moscow.

References

External links

1929 births
2008 deaths
Bulgarian male equestrians
Bulgarian dressage riders
Olympic equestrians of Bulgaria
Olympic silver medalists for Bulgaria
Equestrians at the 1980 Summer Olympics
Olympic medalists in equestrian
Medalists at the 1980 Summer Olympics
20th-century Bulgarian people